Li Rong may refer to:
 Li Rong (philosopher), Taoist philosopher of the Chinese Tang dynasty
 Li Rong (prince) (812–840), imperial prince of the Chinese Tang dynasty
 Li Rong, late Tang dynasty compiler and author of Duyizhi
 Li Rong (linguist) (1920–2002), Chinese linguist and dialectologist